Nam Thien Le (born September 10, 1980 in Irvine, California) is an American professional poker player from Huntington Beach, California.

On March 3, 2006, Le won the World Poker Tour (WPT) fourth season Bay 101 Shooting Star event.  It was his first major poker win.

In 2008 he took down the HK$150,000 No Limit Hold'em – High Rollers Event of APPT – Macau for HK$3,700,000 ($473,915).

As of August 2014, his total live tournament winnings exceed $6,800,000. His 24 cashes at the WSOP account for $854,337 of those winnings.

References

American poker players
Living people
People from Irvine, California
American people of Vietnamese descent
World Poker Tour winners
1980 births